The Warrant of Precedence for Pakistan is a protocol list at which government of Pakistan functions and officials are seated according to their rank and office. Revised Warrant of Precedence of Pakistan is issued by Cabinet Secretariat, Cabinet Division vide letter No.7-2-2003-Min. I. Islamabad. It has been amended from time to time, the following Warrant of Precedence for Pakistan is published for general information.

Order

Explanatory notes

The entries in the above table, which are in alphabetical order in each article, apply exclusively to the persons entered therein, and while regulating their relative precedence with each other accordingly to the number of the article, do not give them any precedence over member of the non-official community resident in Pakistan, who shall take their place according to usage.
Officers in the above table will take precedence in order of the numbers of entries. Those included in one number will take precedence inter-se according to date of entry into the number. When two or more officers enter an article on the same, their inter-se seniority will be fixed on the basis of length of class 1 service. Officers of the defense service will rank inter-se in accordance with their seniority.
Officers of Law Enforcement Agencies when in uniform will salute senior officers of neighboring Arm / Force / Law Enforcement Agency. They will also  "SALUTE" National / State office holders (both elected and nominated) before each official meet. Rule for saluting will be governed by above stipulated precedence. Correspondingly, office holders / civilian officials will also greet senior officers of Law Enforcement Agencies considering their protocol.
All persons not mentioned in the above table, who hold an ex-officio rank, will be placed in the same article as persons holding that rank.
When an officer holds more than one position in the table he will be entitled to the highest position accorded to him.
An officer on entering an article, by virtue of a change in his office to an article lower than that which was occupied by him immediately preceding this change, will take his seniority in the lower article with effect from the date of his entry into the higher article: provided that if he re-enters a lower article in which he was included earlier, he will take his seniority in that lower article from the original date of his entry into it.
All ladies, unless by virtue of holding an appointment themselves, they are entitled to a higher position in the table, will take place according to the rank herein assigned to their husbands.
All other persons who may not be determined in this table will take rank according to general usage, which is to be explained and determined by the president in case any question shall arise.
Retired civil and military officers will be placed at the end of the articles in which they were included immediately before their retirement.
Seniority of the officers will be determined with reference to the holding appointment mentioned in the article, irrespective of the grades which they possess.
Order of protocol will be followed in the same manner for making phone calls through operators.

References

Ministry of Foreign Affairs letter No. U.O.No. Misc.1/12/2005 dated 21Jun2009